Niue competed at the 2018 Commonwealth Games in the Gold Coast, Australia from April 4 to April 15, 2018.

Competitors
The following is the list of number of competitors participating at the Games per sport/discipline.

Athletics

Niue participated with 2 athletes (2 men).

Men
Field events

Boxing

Niue participated with a team of 1 athlete (1 man).

Men

Lawn bowls

Niue is scheduled to compete in the lawn bowls competition.

Men

Women

Shooting

Niue participated with 6 athletes (4 men and 2 women).

Men

Women

References

Nations at the 2018 Commonwealth Games
Niue at the Commonwealth Games
2018 in Niue